Jaushua James Elie Sotirio (born 11 October 1995) is an Australian soccer player who plays as a winger and striker for Newcastle Jets in the A-League.

Club career
Jaushua Sotirio made his league debut on 14 December 2013 at Hunter Stadium against Newcastle Jets FC. His starting debut came on 15 November 2014 against Perth Glory FC, where he also scored in the 2–1 defeat.

On 12 June 2019, Sotirio signed a one-year deal with Wellington Phoenix.

After departing Wellington in 2022, Sotirio signed a two-year deal with rival A-League side Newcastle Jets.

Personal life
Sotirio has dual citizenship (French and Australian), both parents are from New Caledonia.

References

External links

Living people
1995 births
Marconi Stallions FC players
Western Sydney Wanderers FC players
Wellington Phoenix FC players
Newcastle Jets FC players
Association football forwards
Association football wingers
A-League Men players
National Premier Leagues players
Australian people of New Caledonian descent
Soccer players from Sydney
Australian soccer players